Theodore Vigé (2 November 1867, Saint-Agnante (Charent-Inferieure- 19--) was a French entomologist who specialised in Lepidoptera.
He was a contributor to Catalogue des lépidoptères observés dans l'ouest de la France (région atlantique d'altitude inférieure à 300 mètres) par Henri Gelin & Daniel Lucas.
Theodore Vigé  was a Member of the Société Entomologique de France. He lived in Dompierre-sur-Mer.

References
Oberthür, C. 1916: [Brown, F. R. F.] Etudes de lepidopterologie comparée 11

French lepidopterists
1867 births
Year of death missing